Sydney Airport may refer to:

 Sydney Airport, also known as Kingsford Smith International Airport, in Sydney, Australia
 Sydney Airport Corporation, operator of Sydney Airport
 Sydney Airport Holdings, ASX-listed parent company of Sydney Airport Corporation
 Sydney/J.A. Douglas McCurdy Airport, in Nova Scotia, Canada
 Western Sydney Airport, a planned airport to supplement Kingsford Smith International Airport in Sydney, Australia